Arthur Henry Anstey  (187313 November 1955) was Bishop of Trinidad and Tobago from 1918 until 1945; and for his last two years there Archbishop of the West Indies (primate of all the Church in the Province of the West Indies).

Anstey was educated at Charterhouse School and Keble College, Oxford. After graduation, he was ordained in 1898 and began his ecclesiastical career with  curacies at Aylesbury and Bedminster. From 1904 he was principal of St Boniface Missionary College, Warminster and after that (until his appointment to the episcopate) Chaplain to Proctor Swaby, Bishop of Barbados.

There is a school named after Anstey in Port of Spain.

References

1873 births
People educated at Charterhouse School
Alumni of Keble College, Oxford
Anglican bishops of Trinidad and Tobago
20th-century Anglican bishops in the Caribbean
Anglican archbishops of the West Indies
20th-century Anglican archbishops
Commanders of the Order of the British Empire
1955 deaths